Lappert's is an ice cream manufacturer, producing "super-premium" ice cream, based on the island of Kauai in Hawaii. The company runs the largest ice cream chain in Hawaii.  

Lappert's was founded by Walter Lappert when he retired to Hawaii with his second wife Mary and opened an ice cream store. The first batch of ice cream was created on the island of Kauai on December 21, 1983.

Lappert's ice cream is featured in many other independently owned stores. To date, the company has created 8 unique, original flavors which address specific regional demands. 

In addition to ice cream, the Lappert's roasts and sells gourmet coffee.

Walter Lappert's son, Michael Lappert, opened a California brand of his own and named it Lappert's Ice Cream.

References

External links 
 

Ice cream parlors in the United States